Doctor at Large is a British television comedy series based on a set of books by Richard Gordon about the misadventures of a group of newly qualified doctors.  The series follows directly from its predecessor Doctor in the House, and was produced by London Weekend Television in 1971.

Writers for the Doctor at Large episodes were Bill Oddie, Graeme Garden, John Cleese, Graham Chapman, Bernard McKenna, Geoff Rowley, Andy Baker, Jonathan Lynn and David Yallop, as well as George Layton (under the pseudonym of "Oliver Fry").

Plot
The plot revolves around newly qualified Doctor Michael Upton as he tries to make a start in his profession. He obtains a series of jobs, including working in otolaryngology and as a general practitioner, before returning to St. Swithin's Hospital (where he received his training) as a Junior Registrar. Notable events also include Upton's (and other young doctors') pursuit of women.

Characters
Barry Evans - Dr Michael Upton
George Layton - Dr Paul Collier
Geoffrey Davies - Dr Dick Stuart-Clark
Richard O'Sullivan - Dr Lawrence Bingham
Ernest Clark - Professor Geoffrey Loftus
Arthur Lowe - Dr Maxwell
Madeline Smith - Sue Maxwell
Fabia Drake - Dr Whiteland
Brian Oulton - Dr Griffin

Episode list
Airdates given here are for London Weekend Television.

 [01x01] Now, Dr Upton (broadcast on 28 February 1971)
Michael Upton, having qualified as a doctor, has an interview for a house officer post at All Saints Hospital, where they seem mainly interested in his prowess as a rugby wing three-quarter – apart from the cross-dressing consultant chairing the interviews. He ends up back at St Swithin's in ENT outpatients, dealing disastrously with a nosebleed, and a man's imaginary diseases (John Sharp).

 [01x02] You've Really Landed Me In It This Time (7 March 1971)
Dr Collier finds a job at the GP practice of a Scottish Dr Nielson (James Hayter), and learns all about coloured medicines. Mike has to help Paul Collier 'fake' a test for alcohol, while later evading the advances of the randy receptionist (Patsy Rowlands).

 [01x03] You Make Me Feel So Young (14 March 1971)
The first of a sequence of five episodes with Arthur Lowe as Dr Maxwell (the 'major'), and Madeline Smith as his daughter Su, set in a rough area of London. Upton's and Collier's car has its wheels stolen while they are being interviewed. All the patients think Upton is too young, so Maxwell has to find a way of getting them to accept treatment from him.

 [01x04] Doctor Dish (21 March 1971)
Dr Upton is asked by Dr Maxwell to give sex education classes at the local all-girls school and becomes over-popular with the teenage pupils. With Barbara Mitchell as a teacher, Cathy Collins as Carol and John Harvey as Carol's father.

 [01x05] Modernising Major (28 March 1971)
The young doctors obtain an ECG machine to modernise practice at Dr Maxwell's, although its use on patient Mrs Baxter (Marjorie Rhodes) is not a great success.

 [01x06] Congratulations, It's A Toad (4 April 1971)
Paul Collier has an idea for a new pregnancy service involving toads and tadpoles. Local medical colleague Dr McKendrick (Fulton Mackay) comes to speak to Dr Maxwell about the unconventional methods; if the GMC find out they could all be struck off.

 [01x07] Change Your Partners (11 April 1971)
Upton is fancied by Su but gets off with a doctor friend of Dr Stuart Clark, Caroline Cooke (Amanda Reiss) – resulting in a row, illustrated by a comic strip (by Pat Gavin). The major suspects Mike of improper conduct.

 [01x08] Trains and Notes and Veins (18 April 1971)
Going home to his parents between jobs, Upton carries out a consultation on a train with a woman with varicose veins (Jean Kent), who turns out to be his father's patient.

 [01x09] Lock, Stock And Beryl (25 April 1971)
Paul and Michael are fighting over junior jobs in the hospital while Bingham is keeping the most interesting cases for himself.

 [01x10] Upton Sells Out (2 May 1971)
Stuart Clark gets Upton to try for a job at a posh private practice in Harley Street. Problems start when Collier borrows Upton's suit and Mike finds out his duties include walking Dr Whiteland's (Fabia Drake) poodles. Ivor Dean appears as Dr Whiteland's butler.

 [01x11] Saturday Matinee (9 May 1971)
Left to mind the practice Dr Upton has to deal with a government minister (Basil Henson), a hysterical (and he thinks, suicidal) girl (Maureen Lipman) jilted by Dick Stuart Clark, and three toy bears. (Also with Damaris Hayman.)

 [01x12] Where There's A Will (16 May 1971)
Dr Upton is suspected in a case of sudden death of Mr Medwin (Arthur Hewlett) whose vicious family (Sylvia Coleridge, Jack May) are after the money. (With Norah Blaney, Jeffrey Segal, John Nettleton and Tessa Shaw).

 [01x13] Students at heart (23 May 1971)
Upton and Bingham are vying for a surgical house job with a consultant (Frank Middlemass) but celebrations for St Swithin's winning the hospitals rugby cup and an escapade with a mini cause complications.

 [01x14] No ill feeling! (30 May 1971) – written by John Cleese
While starting a new job in general practice for Dr Griffin (Brian Oulton) – a hypochondriac relation of Dr Paul Collier, Michael has to stay at a suburban hotel run by a Mr Clifford (Timothy Bateson) and his domineering wife, whose guests include the resident joker (Roy Kinnear) and three old ladies (Lucy Griffiths, Ailsa Grahame, Betty Hare). This episode was written by John Cleese, and is the suggested prototype for Fawlty Towers.

 [01x15] Let's start at the beginning (6 June 1971)
Michael Upton gets involved in psychiatry and has trouble both with patients (David Jason and Noel Coleman), and the Consultant Psychiatrist (Freddie Jones).

 [01x16] It's all in the mind (13 June 1971)
Still at the practice of Dr Griffin (Brian Oulton) Upton and Collier have problems with the local white witch (Patricia Routledge) who seems to provide better care to some of their own patients (Mollie Sugden, Larry Noble, Miki Ivenia).

 [01x17] Cynthia darling (20 June 1971)
Mrs Askey (Hattie Jacques), a very possessive mother, calls Michael Upton out at all hours to look at her daughter (Moira Foot). Mr Askey (Michael Godfrey) is not amused...

 [01x18] A little help from my friends (27 June 1971)
With Dr Griffin in hospital, Collier and Stuart-Clark try to drum up business at the practice and improve its image including cinema ads, Upton tries to recruit a locum to replace Paul. A very well qualified applicant presents herself (Tessa Wyatt as Dr Nicky Barrington). With Christopher Timothy as a Rolls-Royce representative.

 [01x19] Devon is lovely at this time of year (4 July 1971)
Things get involved between Dr Barrington and Mike.

 [01x20] Operation Loftus (11 July 1971)
Loftus (Ernest Clark) returns to St Swithin's as Professor of Surgery at the same time as Mike lands a job as SHO on the Dean's firm. Loftus, appalled at how standards have slipped, discovers the movement of illicit booze, but is suddenly taken ill. As the Dean (Ralph Michael) has got drunk at the England – France rugby match, Upton has to perform the operation on Loftus. With Astley Harvey and Roy Evans as patients, Jean McFarlane as sister, Arthur English as the head porter, Brian Stirner as First Student and Martin Fisk as Second Student.

 [01x21] Mother and father doing well (18 July 1971)
Fellow doctor Huw Evans (Martin Shaw) and his wife (Ursula Barclay) are expecting. Mike also has to deal with strange patients (Blake Butler and Hugh Walters), and Bingham.

 [01x22] A joke's a joke (25 July 1971)
To earn extra money, Upton and Collier become Anatomy demonstrators. Their sessions coincide with a visit by members of the new board of hospital governors. With Colin Cunningham as the Bishop, Brian Stirner and Juliet Kempson.

 [01x23] Pull the other one! (1 August 1971)
Mike and Dick go after the new intake of student nurses.
With Joy Stewart as Sister Fowles, Andria Lawrence and Maggie Henderson as nurses, and Janina Faye as Paul's 'kid sister'.

 [01x24] It's the rich what gets all the pleasure (8 August 1971)
Drunken celebrations on a train over an inheritance lead Upton, Stuart Clark and Bingham to an overnight stay in the police cells, but Mike and Dick are rescued by Loftus. With Norman Mitchell as a constable and Rupert Davies as the police inspector. It all ends up in front of the hospital board, including Peter Stephens and Harold Bennett.

 [01x25] Things that go mump in the night (15 August 1971)
Back at St Swithin's, Mike is admitted for mumps and despite the attractions of Nurse Parker (Angela Douglas), is keen to get out. With Mollie Maureen as a nervous patient, James Bree as a boring patient and Desmond Jones as his boring brother.

 [01x26] Mr Moon (22 August 1971)
To revise for his primary fellowship exams Michael stays at a health farm run on strict lines by a Mr Moon (John Le Mesurier) where Dick Stuart-Clark has an easy job as the resident doctor. Fellow inmates include Wanda Ventham, Geoffrey Lumsden, Bill Wallis, David King and Tony Bateman, - all desperate to avoid the strict regime.

 [01x27] The Viva (29 August 1971)
Mike goes away for some fishing before his fellowship exam. On his way back to St Swithin's he offers a hitchhiker a lift, but his car breaks down. Stranded in a country pub, he is forced to do his viva (student doctors are given an oral exam, based on their written thesis, called a Viva, short for Viva Voce - Latin for "by live voice") with Loftus and Professor Sinnot (Clifford Mollison) over the phone, despite the pub noise in the background (Stuart Sherwin, David Webb, Cyril Cross).

 [01x28] Bewigged, bothered, bewildered (5 September 1971)
A chaotic evening in Casualty results in an encounter with a judge with piles, Justice Holcroft (Lockwood West), and a criminal, Bertram Hoyle (Jack Smethurst) who is allergic to penicillin. Ending up in court, with QC Mortimer Turnbull (William Lucas) defending Upton, luckily Loftus comes to the rescue.

 [01x29] A situation full of promise (12 September 1971)
The appointment of a senior house surgeon on the Dean's firm doesn't go smoothly when the panel (Upton, Collier and Bingham) are faced with an unexpected candidate. The presence of an American registrar, Rick Harley (Richard Pendrey), sows more confusion. With Nosher Powell (a labourer in Outpatients), Ralph Michael (the Dean), Joan Ingram (his wife), Esta Charkham (the Dean's daughter), and job applicants John Baddeley as Dr McDougall, and – Tessa Wyatt (Nicky Barrington).

Notes
The first six episodes, from "Now, Dr. Upton" to "Congratulations, It's A Toad", were recorded in black and white due to the ITV 'Colour Strike'.

References

External links
Doctor at Large - Nostalgia Central

1970s British sitcoms
Doctor in the House
London Weekend Television shows
First-run syndicated television programs in the United States
ITV sitcoms
1970s British medical television series
1971 British television series debuts
1971 British television series endings
Television shows set in London
Television series by ITV Studios
English-language television shows
Live action television shows based on films